On 2 June 2019 three IED (two of which were car bombs) were detonated by the Islamic State of Iraq and the Levant in northern Syria - one in Azaz and two in Raqqa. Over 30 people were killed, including civilians and dozens of others were wounded. Among the dead were five children.

See also 
January 2017 Azaz bombing
November 2019 Syria bombings
Eastern Syria insurgency
Turkey–ISIL conflict

References 

2019 murders in Syria
21st-century mass murder in Syria
Aleppo Governorate in the Syrian civil war
June 2019
Crime in Aleppo Governorate
Crime in Raqqa Governorate
Improvised explosive device bombings in 2019
June 2019 crimes in Asia
Bombings
Marketplace attacks in Asia
Mass murder in 2019
Raqqa Governorate in the Syrian civil war
June 2019 bombings